This was the first edition of the tournament since 1987.

Irina Bara and Ekaterine Gorgodze won the title, defeating María Lourdes Carlé and Despina Papamichail in the final, 5–7, 7–5, [10–4].

Seeds

Draw

Draw

References

External Links
Main Draw

WTA Argentina Open - Doubles
WTA Argentine Open